Caitlin Hulcup is an Australian mezzo-soprano, who has performed both in Australia and internationally, particularly in Europe.

Early life and education
Hulcup was born in Melbourne and grew up in Perth. At age eleven she took up the violin, going on to study the instrument at the UWA Conservatorium of Music. She received scholarships to the UK and Canada, the latter at the Banff Center for the Arts, with her string quartet. After it broke up, she returned to Perth, switched to viola (which she played in the Western Australian Symphony Orchestra in 1999 and 2000), and took up vocal studies privately with independent teacher Molly McGurk while singing in the Western Australian Opera Chorus.

Singing career
Hulcup was chosen by West Australian Opera to be a Young Artist in 2000, where she performed as Kate Pinkerton in Madama Butterfly and as Cherubino in The Marriage of Figaro. She then studied voice with Anna Connolly at the Victorian College of the Arts, where she won prizes in lieder competitions. She sang Strauss Lieder as the winner of the ABC Symphony Australia Young Performers Awards with the Tasmanian and Sydney Symphony Orchestra—which was broadcast on national radio and television—and sang in the "Credo Mass" by Mozart with the Melbourne Symphony Orchestra in 2001.  Hulcup won Opera Foundation Australia's Covent Garden National Opera Studio Scholarship in 2002, aged 28, and was the Australian candidate for the 2002 International Hans Gabor Belvedere Singing Competition. As a result of the National Opera Studio scholarship, in London she sang Dorabella in Cosi fan Tutte, Meg Page in Falstaff, and the title role of Elektra. She was also a soloist in Bach's Mass in B Minor with the Royal Philharmonic Orchestra. After winning the Opera Foundation Australia Vienna State Opera Award in 2003, she performed for that opera company Enrichetta in I Puritani and Annina in La Traviata in 2004 .

Hulcup made an impression on the international opera scene in 2007, when she replaced Angelika Kirchschlager, who had laryngitis,  as Handel's Ariodante in London and Madrid. The Financial Times wrote that:
she rode the fearsome coloratura of her great Act 1 aria with aplomb. In "Scherza infida" she wrung our hearts, while "Dopo notte" showcased her open-heartedness as well as her brilliant way with the da capo decoration. 
Following her successes in London and Madrid, she sang the role of Meg Page in Falstaff at the Théâtre des Champs-Élysées the next year and Ariodante at the Handel Festival in Germany.

During the 2010–11 season, she was a principal singer at the Vienna State Opera and then performed Vivaldi's Griselda in Sydney for early music group Pinchgut Opera. In 2012 she performed in two newly staged productions, singing the role of Donna Elvira in Valencia and Octavian in Der Rosenkavalier in Florence, both under Zubin Mehta. She also performed Cyrus in Belshazzar with Les Arts Florissants conducted by William Christie in a tour of France, the UK and Spain.

In 2013, Hulcup repeated the role of Donna Elvira with Zubin Mehta in Florence in a new production by director Lorenzo Mariani. She sang Calbo in Rossini's Maometto II for Garsington Opera under David Parry, which was recorded, and then returned to the role of Octavian, performing for the Bolshoi Theatre in Moscow under Vassily Sinaisky. After giving recitals and masterclasses at the University of Western Australia, she sang the title role of Sesto in La Clemenza di Tito, in Taipei, in a new Justin Way production of La Clemenza di Tito conducted by Benjamin Bayl.

In 2014, the mezzo performed the role of Cesare in Vivaldi's Catone in Utica at the Théâtre des Champs-Élysées in Paris, Alceste in Admeto in the Theater an der Wien in Vienna  with Alan Curtis, and in Il Complesso Barocco.  Additionally, Beethoven's Missa solemnis with Martin Haselböck and Wiener Akademie was also presented at the Theatre an der Wien.

As of 2019 she is Professor of Singing at the Royal Academy of Music in London and a visiting academic to the University of Melbourne, and as of 2021, also teaches at the Universität der Künste.

Personal life
Hulcup is married to Florian Thomas, an Austrian tenor. Her first husband was Malte Ebach, a paleontologist.

References

External links
Official website
"Caitlin Hulcup, Mezzo-soprano":  Artist's profile on her management's website, rayfieldallied.com

1970s births
Living people
Operatic mezzo-sopranos
21st-century Australian women opera singers
20th-century violists
Musicians from Perth, Western Australia
Singers from Melbourne
University of Western Australia alumni
Victorian College of the Arts alumni
Academics of the Royal Academy of Music
Academic staff of the University of Melbourne
University of Melbourne women
Academic staff of the Berlin University of the Arts
Voice teachers
Australian women academics
Australian classical violinists
Women classical violinists
20th-century classical violinists
Australian classical violists
Women violists
Year of birth missing (living people)